Hygromia is a genus of air-breathing land snails, terrestrial pulmonate gastropod mollusks in the family Hygromiidae, the hairy snails and their allies.

Species
Species within the genus Hygromia include:
 † Hygromia carinatissima (Sacco, 1886) 
 Hygromia cinctella Draparnaud, 1801
 Hygromia golasi Prieto & Puente, 1992
 Hygromia limbata (Draparnaud, 1805)
 Hygromia montana
 Hygromia odeca (Bourguignat, 1882)
 Hygromia riopida
 Hygromia striolata
 Hygromia tassyi (Bourguignat, 1884)
Species brought into synonymy
 Hygromia folliculata Risso, 1826: synonym of Ciliella ciliata (W. Hartmann, 1821) (junior synonym)
 Hygromia kovacsi Varga & Pintér, 1972: synonym of Kovacsia kovacsi (Varga & L. Pintér, 1972) (original combination)
 Hygromia notophila Cockerell, 1924: synonym of Lindholmomneme notophila (Cockerell, 1924) (original combination)
 Hygromia radleyi Jousseaume, 1894: synonym of Landouria radleyi (Jousseaume, 1894) (original combination)
 Hygromia transsylvanica (Westerlund, 1876): synonym of Lozekia transsylvanica (Westerlund, 1876)

References

 Bank, R. A. (2017). Classification of the Recent terrestrial Gastropoda of the World. Last update: July 16th, 2017

External links
 
 Risso A. (1826). Histoire naturelle des principales productions de l'Europe méridionale et particulièrement de celles des environs de Nice et des Alpes Maritimes, vol. 4. Paris: Levrault. vii + 439 pp., pls 1-12.

 
Gastropod genera
Taxonomy articles created by Polbot